Throughout the history of the Grammy Awards, many significant records have been set. This page only includes the competitive awards which have been won by various artists. This does not include the various special awards that are presented by the National Academy of Recording Arts and Sciences such as Lifetime Achievement Awards, Trustees Awards, Technical Awards or Legend Awards. The page however does include other non-performance related Grammys (known as the Craft & Production Fields) that may have been presented to the artist(s).

Awards

Most Grammys won

The record for the most Grammy Awards won in a lifetime is held by Beyoncé, an American singer, songwriter, and dancer, who has won 32. It was previously held by Georg Solti, a Hungarian-British conductor, who won 31.

Most Grammys won by a female artist
Beyoncé has won 32 Grammy Awards.

Most Grammys won by a male artist
Georg Solti has won 31 Grammy Awards.

Most Grammys won by a group

U2 holds the record for most Grammy Awards won by a group. They have won 22 awards.

Most Grammys won by a producer

Quincy Jones holds the record for most Grammy Awards won by a producer, with 28 awards. Eleven of these were awarded for production duties; Jones has also received Grammys as an arranger and a performing artist. Some producers have also won awards as engineers, mixers, and/or mastering engineers.

Most Grammys won by a rapper 

Jay-Z and Kanye West, each with 24 awards, have won more Grammy Awards than any other rapper. Lauryn Hill is the most awarded female rapper, with eight Grammy Awards.

Most Grammys won by an engineer or mixer 
Al Schmitt, with 20 awards, has won more Grammy Awards than any other engineer or mixer. Şerban Ghenea is second with 19 Grammy Awards.

Youngest winners

The Peasall Sisters are the youngest Grammy winners, when they were credited artists on the O Brother, Where Art Thou? soundtrack, which won Album of the Year in 2002. Blue Ivy Carter is the youngest individually credited winner. She was 9 years old when she won her first award in 2021, after she was credited on her mother Beyoncé's song "Brown Skin Girl", released in 2019. LeAnn Rimes is the youngest individual winner. She was 14 years old when she won her first two awards in 1997.  She was also the first Country artist to win the Best New Artist Grammy.

Youngest artists to win Album of the Year (as lead artist)

Billie Eilish is the youngest artist to win Album of the Year as a lead. She was 18 years old, while winning for her album When We All Fall Asleep, Where Do We Go? in 2020.

Youngest artists to win Record of the Year
At 18 years of age, Billie Eilish became the youngest artist to win Record of the Year when she won for "Bad Guy" in 2020.

Youngest artist to win Song of the Year

At 17 years of age, Lorde became the youngest artist to win Song of the Year when she won for "Royals" in 2014.

Youngest artist to win Best New Artist

At 14 years of age, LeAnn Rimes became the youngest Best New Artist winner when she won in 1997.

Oldest winners

Pinetop Perkins is the oldest person to win a Grammy. In 2011 he was awarded with Best Traditional Blues Album for Joined at the Hip, at 97 years of age.

Note: Sources vary on the birth year of Elizabeth Cotten, with some stating it as 1893, while others say 1895. The above information credits it as 1895. With either year, Cotten is the oldest female Grammy winner.

Most honored albums
Santana's Supernatural and U2's How to Dismantle an Atomic Bomb hold the record for most honoured album having won nine awards. Supernatural won nine awards in 2000 and How to Dismantle an Atomic Bomb won three awards in 2005 and won a further six in 2006 giving it a total of nine awards.

Most Album of the Year wins

The record for most Album of the Year wins is four. Two engineer/mixers and one mastering engineer have won the award four times;
 
 Şerban Ghenea, engineer/mixer — 1989 (2016), 25 (2017), 24K Magic (2018), Folklore (2021)
 John Hanes, engineer/mixer — 1989 (2016), 25 (2017), 24K Magic (2018), Folklore (2021)
 Tom Coyne, mastering engineer — 21 (2012), 1989 (2016), 25 (2017), 24K Magic (2018)

Four recording artists, four record producers, two engineer/mixers and two mastering engineers have won the award three times;

 Frank Sinatra, artist — Come Dance with Me! (1960), September of My Years (1966), A Man and His Music (1967)
 Stevie Wonder, artist — Innervisions (1974), Fulfillingness' First Finale (1975), Songs in the Key of Life (1977)
 Paul Simon, artist — Bridge over Troubled Water (1971), Still Crazy After All These Years (1976), Graceland (1987)
 Taylor Swift, artist — Fearless (2010), 1989 (2016), Folklore (2021)
 David Foster, producer — Unforgettable... with Love (1992), The Bodyguard - Original Soundtrack Album (1994), Falling into You (1997)
 Phil Ramone, producer — Still Crazy After All These Years (1976), 52nd Street (1980), Genius Loves Company (2005)
 Daniel Lanois, producer — The Joshua Tree (1988), Time Out of Mind (1998), How to Dismantle an Atomic Bomb (2006)
 Ryan Tedder, producer — 21 (2012), 1989 (2016), 25 (2017)
 Mike Piersante, engineer/mixer — O Brother, Where Art Thou? – Soundtrack (2002), Raising Sand (2009), 25 (2017)
 Tom Elmhirst, engineer/mixer — 21 (2012), Morning Phase (2015), 25 (2017)
 Bob Ludwig, mastering engineer — Babel (2013), Random Access Memories (2014), Morning Phase (2015)
 Randy Merrill, mastering engineer — 25 (2017), Folklore (2021), Harry's House (2023)

Most Record of the Year wins
The record for most Record of the Year wins is four. One mastering engineer has won the award four consecutive times;

 Tom Coyne, mastering engineer — “Stay with Me (Darkchild Version)” (2015), “Uptown Funk” (2016), “Hello” (2017), “24K Magic” (2018)

Two recording artists and four engineers/mixers have won the award three times;

 Paul Simon, artist — “Mrs. Robinson” (1969), “Bridge over Troubled Water” (1971), “Graceland” (1988)
 Bruno Mars, artist — “Uptown Funk” (2016), “24K Magic” (2018), “Leave the Door Open” (2022)
 Tom Elmhirst, engineer/mixer — “Rehab” (2008), “Rolling in the Deep” (2012), “Hello” (2017)
 Şerban Ghenea, engineer/mixer – “Uptown Funk” (2016), “24K Magic” (2018), “Leave the Door Open” (2022)
 John Hanes, engineer/mixer – “Uptown Funk” (2016), “24K Magic” (2018), “Leave the Door Open” (2022)
 Charles Moniz, engineer/mixer – “Uptown Funk” (2016), “24K Magic” (2018), “Leave the Door Open” (2022)

Most Song of the Year wins

The record for the most Song of the Year wins is two. Twelve songwriters have won in this category twice;
 
 Henry Mancini - “Moon River” (1962), “Days of Wine and Roses” (1964)
 Johnny Mercer - “Moon River” (1962), “Days of Wine and Roses” (1964) 
 James Horner - “Somewhere Out There” (1988), “My Heart Will Go On” (1999)
 Will Jennings - “Tears in Heaven” (1993), “My Heart Will Go On” (1999) 
 Bono - “Beautiful Day” (2001), “Sometimes You Can't Make It on Your Own” (2006)
 Adam Clayton - “Beautiful Day” (2001), “Sometimes You Can't Make It on Your Own” (2006)
 The Edge - “Beautiful Day” (2001), “Sometimes You Can't Make It on Your Own” (2006)
 Larry Mullen Jr. - “Beautiful Day” (2001), “Sometimes You Can't Make It on Your Own” (2006)
 Adele - “Rolling in the Deep” (2012), “Hello” (2017)
 Brody Brown - “That's What I Like” (2018), “Leave the Door Open” (2022)
 D'Mile - “I Can't Breathe” (2021), “Leave the Door Open” (2022)
 Bruno Mars - “That's What I Like” (2018), “Leave the Door Open” (2022)

Most Grammys won for consecutive studio albums
Beyoncé has won eight consecutive awards for eight consecutive studio albums (including Everything Is Love).

Alison Krauss and Union Station, Pat Metheny (along with the Pat Metheny Group), and The Manhattan Transfer have won seven consecutive awards for seven consecutive studio albums.

Most consecutive Grammys won for the same category

Artists who have won all four General Field awards

There have been only three artists who have won all four General Field awards: Album of the Year, Record of the Year, Song of the Year, and Best New Artist.

In 1981, Christopher Cross became the first artist to win all four awards, as well as the first act to win them all in a single year.

In 2009, Adele won Best New Artist, earned three other awards in both 2012 and 2017. She was the second artist to win all four accolades throughout her career, and the first to do so on separate occasions.

In 2020, Billie Eilish became the third musician to win all four awards, and first female artist to win them during a single ceremony.

Single ceremony

Most Grammys won in one night
The record for most Grammys won in one night is eight. Michael Jackson won eight in 1984 and Santana tied Jackson's record in 2000.

Most Grammys won by a male artist in one night

The record for most Grammys won by a male artist in one night is eight. Michael Jackson won eight in 1984.

Most Grammys won by a female artist in one night

The record for most Grammys won by a female artist in one night is six. Beyoncé and Adele each won six in 2010 and 2012, respectively.

Most Grammys won by a group in one night

The record for most Grammys won by a group artist in one night is eight. Santana won eight in 2000.

Most Grammys won by a record producer in one night

The record for most awards won by a producer in one night is six. The record was set by Quincy Jones who won six awards in 1991, including Album of the Year, Best Arrangement On An Instrumental, Best Instrumental Arrangement Accompanying Vocal(s), Best Jazz Fusion Performance, Best Pop Instrumental Performance, Best Rap Performance By A Duo Or Group, as well as Producer of the Year, Non-Classical for his own studio album Back on the Block.

Finneas O'Connell tied the record in 2020, winning Producer of the Year, Non-Classical and five additional awards, including Record of the Year, Album of the Year, Song of the Year, Best Engineered Album, Non-Classical, and Best Pop Vocal Album for his contribution on Billie Eilish's When We All Fall Asleep, Where Do We Go?.

Most Grammys won by an engineer or mixer in one night

The most Grammys won by an engineer or mixer in one night is six. At the 59th Annual Grammy Awards in 2017, Tom Elmhirst won Record of the Year, Album of the Year, Best Pop Vocal Album, Best Rock Album, Best Alternative Music Album, as well as Best Engineered Album, Non-Classical for his work on Adele's 25, Cage the Elephant's Tell Me I'm Pretty, and David Bowie's Blackstar respectively.

Artists who have won all four General Field Awards at a single ceremony

Christopher Cross (1981) and Billie Eilish (2020) are the only artists who have received all four General Field awards in one night.

Artists who have won Album, Record, and Song of the Year in one night

The three biggest Grammy Awards are Album of the Year, Record of the Year, and Song of the Year. Eight artists have won all three in one night. Adele is the first and only artist in Grammy history to accomplish this feat twice.

Most Grammys won by an album in one night

The most awards awarded to an album in one night is nine. At the 42nd Annual Grammy Awards in 2000 Santana's Supernatural was awarded nine awards. It won Record of the Year, Album of the Year, Song of the Year, Best Pop Collaboration with Vocals, Best Pop Instrumental Performance, Best Pop Performance by a Duo or Group with Vocals, Best Rock Instrumental Performance, Best Rock Performance by a Duo or Group with Vocal, and Best Rock Album.

Most posthumous Grammys won in one night

 
Ray Charles holds the record for most posthumous awards won in one night. He was awarded five Grammy Awards at the 47th Annual Grammy Awards in 2005, including both Record of the Year and Album of the Year.

Nominations

Most Grammy nominations

Beyoncé and Jay-Z tie for the record for the most Grammy nominations with 88 each.

Most nominations in one night

Michael Jackson and Babyface hold the record for most Grammy nominations in one night with 12 nominations each.

Most nominations without winning

With 18 nominations, Zubin Mehta has received the most Grammy nominations without winning.

Most nominations in one night without winning

The record for most Grammy nominations without a win in one night is 9, held by Paul McCartney. The record was set in 1966.

Grammy nominations in the most fields

Artists who had been nominated for all four General Field awards in one night

Only thirteen artists have been nominated for all four General Field awards in one night. Lizzo is the oldest person to be nominated for all four awards in one night, at 31 years old; while the youngest person to be nominated is Billie Eilish at 17 years old. Both were nominated in 2020, making it the first time that two artists were nominated for all four awards in one night. In 1968, Bobbie Gentry became the first person and first female artist to be nominated for all four awards, followed by Christopher Cross in 1981 and Fun. in 2013, becoming the first male artist and first group to be nominated, respectively. In addition, Finneas O'Connell was nominated for all four General Field awards in 2022, but he was not credited as a performing artist in three of the four categories.

Youngest nominees
Leah Peasall of The Peasall Sisters is the youngest ever Grammy nominee (and winner) as one of the credited artists on the O Brother, Where Art Thou? - Soundtrack in 2002. Deleon Richards is the youngest performer to receive an individual nomination, for Best Soul/Gospel performance.

See also

Latin Grammy Award records
List of Academy Award records
List of people who have won Academy, Emmy, Grammy, and Tony Awards

References

Notes

External links

Official Grammy Awards website

Records
Records (superlatives)